Nathalie Stutzmann (née Dupuy; born 6 May 1965) is a French contralto and conductor.

Biography
Born in Suresnes in France, Stutzmann first studied with her mother, soprano Christiane Stutzmann, then at Nancy Conservatoire and later at the École d'Art Lyrique of the Paris Opera, focusing on lieder, under Hans Hotter's tutelage.  She is noted for her interpretations of French mélodies and German lieder. Stutzmann also plays piano, bassoon and is a chamber musician. Stutzmann debuted as a concert singer at the Salle Pleyel, Paris, 1985, in Bach's Magnificat. Her recital debut was the following year in Nantes.  In addition to her concert work, Stutzmann has taught at the Geneva University of Music.  She began performing and recording with Inger Södergren in 1994. She took part in the project of Ton Koopman and the Amsterdam Baroque Orchestra & Choir to record Bach's complete vocal works.

Separately, Stutzmann developed an interest in conducting, where her mentors included Jorma Panula, Seiji Ozawa, and Simon Rattle.  In 2009, Stutzmann founded the chamber orchestra Orfeo 55, with which she has performed as both soloist and conductor.  She served as its artistic director until Orfeo 55 ceased operations in April 2019.

In September 2017, Stutzmann became principal guest conductor of the RTÉ National Symphony Orchestra in Dublin, Ireland, with a contract for three years.  In 2018, she was appointed chief conductor of the Kristiansand Symphony Orchestra, in Kristiansand, Norway, the first female chief conductor in the orchestra's history.  In December 2020, her Kristiansand contract was extended through 2023.  

In the USA, the Philadelphia Orchestra announced the appointment of Stutzmann as its next principal guest conductor in December 2020, the first female conductor ever named to this Philadelphia post, effective with the 2021–2022 season, with a contract of 3 years.  

Separately, in December 2020, Stutzmann first guest-conducted the Atlanta Symphony Orchestra.  She returned to the Atlanta Symphony Orchestra in February 2021 for an additional guest-conducting engagement, in a streamed quarantine concert.  In October 2021, the Atlanta Symphony Orchestra announced the appointment of Stutzmann as its next music director, effective with the 2022–2023 season, with an initial contract of four years.  Stutzmann is the first female conductor to be named music director of the Atlanta Symphony Orchestra.

Quotes
Il y a deux types d’artistes: ceux qui s’attachent toute leur vie à montrer à quel point ce qu’ils sont en train de faire est difficile – ils ont leur public –, puis il y a ceux qui passent leur vie à essayer de faire croire que ce n’est pas du tout difficile, catégorie à laquelle j’appartiens. C’est sans doute aussi une forme de folie. C’est moins spectaculaire, peut-être, mais je préfère que le public puisse aller à l’essentiel. Je ne veux pas qu’il s’arrête à la performance, tout en la remarquant, mais qu’il puisse s’abandonner d’abord à la beauté de la musique.

There are two types of artists: those that strive their whole life to show how much what they're doing is difficult – they [do] have their audience -, then there are those who spend their life trying to make people believe it is not at all difficult, which is the category I belong to. That is also probably a form of madness. It is less spectacular, perhaps, but I prefer that the audience be able to go to what is essential [in the music]. I do not want them to stop at [being impressed with] the performance, even though they might notice it, but that they be able to abandon themselves to the beauty of the music.

Recordings
Stutzmann has recorded commercially for such labels as EMI, Erato, Deutsche Grammophon, Harmonia Mundi, Philips, RCA, Sony Classical, and Virgin. Some of her most admired recordings as a singer are of Schumann Lieder, Chausson and Poulenc melodies, Mahler Symphony No. 2 with Seiji Ozawa, Vivaldi's Nisi Dominus and Schubert's Winterreise for Calliope, Michel Lambert's Leçons de Ténèbres.

Her awards for vocal recordings include the Preis der deutschen Schallplattenkritik, Diapason d'Or, and the Japan Record Academy Award. She earned a Grammy nomination for her recording of Debussy's Le Martyre de saint Sébastien.

Awards and honours
 1987: 1st prize of Neue Stimmen
 2001: Chevalier of the Ordre des Arts et des Lettres
 2012: Chevalier of the Ordre national du Mérite
 2014: Officier of the Order of Cultural Merit (Monaco)
 2015: Officier of the Ordre des Arts et des Lettres
 2019: Chevalier of the Legion of Honour

References

External links
  of Nathalie Stutzmann
 Askonas Holt agency page on Nathalie Stutzmann
  Nathalie Stutzmann (Contralto) at Bach Cantatas Website
 Nathalie Stutzmann at Warner Classics

1965 births
Living people
People from Suresnes
French contraltos
Operatic contraltos
Women conductors (music)
Women performers of early music
20th-century French women  opera singers
20th-century French conductors (music)
21st-century French women  opera singers
21st-century French conductors (music)
Knights of the Ordre national du Mérite
Chevaliers of the Légion d'honneur
Officiers of the Ordre des Arts et des Lettres
Officers of the Order of Cultural Merit (Monaco)
Erato Records artists